The lunulated antbird (Oneillornis lunulatus) is a species of insectivorous bird in the family Thamnophilidae. It is found in Ecuador and Peru. Its natural habitat is subtropical or tropical moist lowland forests.

This species is a specialist ant-followers that relies on swarms of army ants to flush insects and other arthropods out of the leaf litter.

The lunulated antbird was described and illustrated by the English ornithologists Philip Sclater and Osbert Salvin in 1873 and given the binomial name Pithys lunulatus. The species was subsequently included in the genus Gymnopithys. It was moved to a newly erected genus Oneillornis based on the results of a molecular phylogenetic study published in 2014. The species is monotypic.

References

lunulated antbird
Birds of the Ecuadorian Amazon
Birds of the Peruvian Amazon
lunulated antbird
lunulated antbird
lunulated antbird
Taxonomy articles created by Polbot